Synod of Worms or Council of Worms may refer to:

Synod of Worms (868)
Synod of Worms (1076)